Jean-Claude Daunat (14 September 1945 – 26 December 1999) was a French racing cyclist. He rode in the 1971 Tour de France.

References

1945 births
1999 deaths
French male cyclists
Place of birth missing